Yatesville is a town in Upson County, Georgia, United States. The population was 408 at the 2000 census.

History
Yatesville was founded in 1888 when the railroad was extended to that point, and named after A.J. Yates, a first settler. The Georgia General Assembly incorporated Yatesville as a town in 1896.

Geography

Yatesville is located at  (32.912663, -84.142393).

The town is located along Georgia State Route 74, which runs from west to east through the center of town. GA-74 leads east 35 mi (56 km) to Macon and west 12 mi (19 km) to Thomaston, the Upson County seat.

Demographics

As of the census of 2000, there were 408 people, 158 households and 124 families residing in the town. The racial makeup of the town was 75.74% White, 23.77% African American, 0.25% Native American, 0.25% from other races. Hispanic or Latino of any race were 0.74% of the population.

There were 159 households, out of which 30.8% had children under the age of 18 living with them, 58.5% were married couples living together, 11.9% had a female householder with no husband present, and 22.0% were non-families. 19.5% of all households were made up of individuals, and 11.3% had someone living alone who was 65 years of age or older.  The average household size was 2.57 and the average family size was 2.91.

In the town, the population was spread out, with 21.8% under the age of 18, 9.1% from 18 to 24, 29.2% from 25 to 44, 22.5% from 45 to 64, and 17.4% who were 65 years of age or older.  The median age was 39 years. For every 100 females, there were 90.7 males.  For every 100 females age 18 and over, there were 87.6 males.

The median income for a household in the town was $38,750, and the median income for a family was $38,500. Males had a median income of $30,096 versus $25,500 for females. The per capita income for the town was $21,762.  About 9.2% of families and 9.4% of the population were below the poverty line, including 16.5% of those under age 18 and none of those age 65 or over.

References

Towns in Upson County, Georgia
Towns in Georgia (U.S. state)